Million Dollar Beach House is a reality streaming television series that aired on Netflix on August 26, 2020. The show follows a group of young and ambitious agents, part of the Nest Seekers International, selling multi-million dollar deals on luxurious listings in The Hamptons. Season 1 consisted of six episodes. As of September 2020, there had been no confirmation of a second season.

Subsequently it was announced that the show had been picked up by Discovery+ and would be renamed “Selling the Hamptons.” The filming of Season One of Selling the Hamptons wrapped in Summer 2021 and began streaming on January 20, 2022.

Cast
 J.B. Andreassi 
 Michael Fulfree
 James "Jimmy" Giugliano
 Noel Roberts
 Peggy Zabakolas

Episodes

Release 
Million Dollar Beach House was released on August 26, 2020, on Netflix.

References

External links
 
 

2020s American reality television series
2020 American television series debuts
English-language Netflix original programming
The Hamptons, New York
Television shows set in New York (state)